Mohamed Rjaya Ahmad Abbas Abdou El-Souad (born 5 November 1968) is an Egyptian modern pentathlete. He competed at the 1988 and 1992 Summer Olympics.

References

External links
 

1968 births
Living people
Egyptian male modern pentathletes
Olympic modern pentathletes of Egypt
Modern pentathletes at the 1988 Summer Olympics
Modern pentathletes at the 1992 Summer Olympics